The Asunción International Marathon, known by its acronym as MIA, is an annual road running event over the marathon distance (42.195 km) which takes place in August in Asunción, Paraguay, since 2010.

Winners
Key:

See also
Sport in Paraguay
List of marathon races in South America

References

Marathons in Paraguay
Sports competitions in Asunción
Recurring sporting events established in 2010
2010 establishments in Paraguay
August sporting events
Summer events in Paraguay